Katya Soldak is a New-York-based journalist, documentary filmmaker, and author of Ukrainian origin. She is currently the editorial director for Forbes Media's international editions, focussing on Eastern Europe and the post-Soviet territories.

Early life and education
Soldak was born and raised in Ukraine. In 2008, she graduated from Columbia University Graduate School of Journalism with a Master’s degree in digital media.

Career
After graduation, Soldak began work as a journalist, covering issues related to Eastern Europe. She also directed the in 2020 released documentary The Long Breakup.  

She is the author of the memoir-essay "This Is How Propaganda Works", which chronicles her experiences growing up in the Soviet Union.

Katya Soldak holds the positon of an editorial director of Forbes Media's international editions, with the focus of Eastern Europe and anything related to Post-Soviet territory. Her work is also seen in NewsBreak, Forbes Argentina, BEAMSTART, Forbes Ecuador.

Personal life
Soldak lives and works in New York City with her daughter.

References

External links

 

1977 births
Living people
American documentary film directors
Columbia University Graduate School of Journalism alumni